Otterman is a surname. Notable people with the surname include:

 John Otterman, former member of the Ohio House of Representatives
 Robert J. Otterman, former member of the Ohio House of Representatives
 Michael Otterman, freelance journalist and documentary filmmaker

See also
Kushtaka, a mythical shape-shifting creature
Ottoman (disambiguation)